Calotemognatha is a genus of beetles in the family Buprestidae, containing the following species:

 Calotemognatha laevicollis (Saunders, 1868)
 Calotemognatha varicollis (Carter, 1913)
 Calotemognatha yarelli (Gory & Laporte, 1838)

References

Buprestidae genera